The 2002 FIA GT Championship was the sixth season of the FIA GT Championship, an auto racing series regulated by the Fédération Internationale de l'Automobile (FIA) and organized by the Stéphane Ratel Organisation (SRO).  The races featured grand touring cars divided into two categories and awarded championships and cups for drivers and teams in each category.  The season commenced on 21 April 2002 and concluded on 20 October 2002 with ten races held through Europe.

Christophe Bouchut won his second consecutive GT Drivers' Championship by a single point over Larbre Compétition-Chereau teammate David Terrien.  Larbre also secured the team championship, beating Lister Storm Racing  The N-GT Cup was won by Porsche driver Stéphane Ortelli after he won seven races, while his Freisinger Motorsport squad earned the teams title.

Schedule
The FIA GT Championship retained its partnership with Eurosport and the European Touring Car Championship, sharing their schedule and race weekends under the Super Racing Weekend moniker, now with sponsorship from LG Corporation.  The ETCC also added a support event for the Spa 24 Hours for the first time, instead of the FIA GT series running on its own.  Several races were however dropped or replaced for 2002, with the schedule shortened to ten rounds from eleven.  Monza was replaced by the Autodromo di Pergusa for the Italian round, and Oschersleben became the German round for the first time since 1999, replacing the Nürburgring.  Donington Park became the second British round, as it too had been used in 1999.  The Hungaroring, Zolder, and A1-Ring were all removed from the calendar, while Anderstorp marked the first Scandinavian event held since Helsinki Thunder in 1997.  All events, with exception of Spa, retained their  race distance.

Entries

GT

N-GT

Results and standings

Race results

Points were awarded to the top six finishers in each category.  Entries were required to complete 75% of the race distance in order to be classified as a finisher and earn points.  Drivers were required to complete 20% of the total race distance for their car to earn points.  Teams scored points for all cars that finished a race.  For the Spa 24 Hours, half points were awarded to the top six in each category at the end of six and twelve hours of the race; full points were then awarded at the race's end.

Driver championships

GT Championship
The GT Drivers Championship was won by Christophe Bouchut driving a Larbre Compétition-Chereau Chrysler Viper GTS-R.

N-GT Cup

The N-GT Drivers title was won by Stéphane Ortelli driving a Freisinger Motorsport Porsche 911 GT3-RS.

Teams championships

GT Championship

N-GT Cup

References

External links
 www.fiagt.com as archive at web.archive.org on 20 April 2003

FIA GT Championship
FIA GT Championship seasons